The Julian and Kokenge Company building, now known as the Julian, is a historic building in the River South District of Downtown Columbus, Ohio. It was listed on the National Register of Historic Places in 2013.

The  L-shaped building was constructed in two portions: the southern portion in 1921 along West Main St. and the eastern portion in 1932, extending north along Wall St. The building was the manufacturing plant of the Julian and Kokenge Co., a shoe company founded in Cincinnati in 1893. The company relocated to Columbus, constructing the building in 1921, designed by the Frank Hill Smith Co. of Dayton. The shoe company was headquartered here until shuttering in 1975. The Julian was renovated from 2014 to 2016, modifying the space into apartment units. The building's 85 percent window to wall ratio was seen as a positive for redevelopment, although a challenge while renovating: the windows were covered when the building was used as a storage facility in the 1970s. Another aspect that encouraged redevelopment was the L-shaped layout, allowing for light to all sides of the building.

Gallery

See also
 National Register of Historic Places listings in Columbus, Ohio

References

External links

 The Julian apartment complex website
 Emporis

Buildings in downtown Columbus, Ohio
Commercial buildings completed in 1899
Commercial buildings on the National Register of Historic Places in Ohio
National Register of Historic Places in Columbus, Ohio